Rocket Power is an American animated television series created by Arlene Klasky and Gábor Csupó. It originally premiered on Nickelodeon on August 16, 1999, and ended on July 30, 2004, with a total of seventy-one episodes over the course of four seasons.

Series overview

Episodes

Pilot

Season 1 (1999–2000)

Season 2 (2000–01; 2004)

Season 3 (2001–04)

Season 4 (2003–04)

References

External links
 
 

Rocket Power
Rocket Power
Rocket Power